Edison's Phonograph Doll is a children's toy doll developed by the Edison Phonograph Toy Manufacturing Company (founded by William W. Jacques and Lowell Briggs in 1887) introduced in 1890. The original doll was invented by Thomas Edison in 1877. The 22-inch doll featured a miniature removable phonograph that played a single nursery rhyme. Although it had spent several years in experimentation and development, the Edison Talking Doll was a sales failure, and was only marketed for a few short weeks in early 1890. A handle had to be cranked each time for it to play. Also, the ring-shaped wax records wore out quickly, and were prone to cracking  and warping. Additionally, many children (and some adults) reportedly found the   dolls and recordings frightening.

In 2015, the Lawrence Berkeley National Laboratory, in collaboration with the Library of Congress, developed a three-dimensional optical scanning system called IRENE-3D, which allowed surviving discs to be scanned and the audio to be reproduced. As of April 2015, eight recordings had been digitized and may be heard at the National Park Service website.

Gallery

References

Products introduced in 1890
Doll brands
Thomas Edison
1890s toys
United States National Recording Registry recordings